In mathematical analysis, the Dirichlet kernel, named after the German mathematician Peter Gustav Lejeune Dirichlet, is the collection of periodic functions defined as

where  is any nonnegative integer. The kernel functions are periodic with period .

The importance of the Dirichlet kernel comes from its relation to Fourier series.

where

is the th Fourier coefficient of . This implies that in order to study convergence of Fourier series it is enough to study properties of the Dirichlet kernel.

L1 norm of the kernel function

One can estimate that

This lack of uniform integrability is behind many divergence phenomena for the Fourier series. For example, together with the uniform boundedness principle, it can be used to show that the Fourier series of a continuous function may fail to converge pointwise, in rather dramatic fashion. See convergence of Fourier series for further details. 

A precise proof of the first result that  is given by 

 

where we have used the Taylor series identity that  and where  are the first-order harmonic numbers.

Relation to the periodic delta function

The Dirichlet kernel is a periodic function which becomes the Dirac comb, i.e. the periodic delta function, in the limit
 
with the angular frequency .

This can be inferred from the autoconjugation property of the Dirichlet kernel under forward and inverse Fourier transform:

In a different vein, consider ∆(x) as the identity element for convolution on functions of period 2. In other words, we have

for every function  of period 2. The Fourier series representation of this "function" is

(This Fourier series converges to the function almost nowhere.) Therefore the Dirichlet kernel, which is just the sequence of partial sums of this series, can be thought of as an approximate identity. Abstractly speaking it is not however an approximate identity of positive elements (hence the failures in pointwise covergence mentioned above).

Proof of the trigonometric identity

The trigonometric identity

displayed at the top of this article may be established as follows.  First recall that the sum of a finite geometric series is

In particular, we have

In the case  we have

as required.

Alternative proof of the trigonometric identity

Start with the series

to reduce the terms in the sum.

which telescopes down to the result.

Variant of identity 
If the sum is only over non negative integers (which may arise when computing a discrete Fourier transform that is not centered), then using similar techniques we can show the following identity:

See also 
 Fejér kernel

References
 Andrew M. Bruckner, Judith B. Bruckner, Brian S. Thomson: Real Analysis. ClassicalRealAnalysis.com 1996, S.620 (vollständige Online-Version (Google Books))
 Podkorytov, A. N. (1988), "Asymptotic behavior of the Dirichlet kernel of Fourier sums with respect to a polygon". Journal of Soviet Mathematics, 42(2): 1640–1646. doi: 10.1007/BF01665052
 Levi, H. (1974), "A geometric construction of the Dirichlet kernel". Transactions of the New York Academy of Sciences, 36: 640–643. doi: 10.1111/j.2164-0947.1974.tb03023.x
 
 Dirichlet-Kernel at PlanetMath

Mathematical analysis
Fourier series
Approximation theory
Articles containing proofs